Abū ʿUthmān ʿAmr ibn ʿUthmān ibn ʿAffān was the eldest or one of the eldest sons of Caliph Uthman and played political and military roles during the caliphates of Mu'awiya I, Yazid I and Marwan I.

Life 
Amr was a son of Caliph Uthman from the Umayyad clan of the Quraysh tribe and his wife Umm Amr bint Jundab ibn Amr of the Daws clan of the Azd tribe. He was born during the rule of Uthman's predecessor, Caliph Umar. Biographical details about Amr are often confused in the traditional Islamic sources with Amr's full brother Umar. The historian al-Baladhuri (d. 892) asserts that Amr was Uthman's eldest son to have survived the caliph, who was killed in 656, and the historian Mus'ab al-Zubayri (d. 851) holds that Amr was the eldest of Uthman's sons to leave descendants, while the historians Ibn Hajar al-Asqalani (d. 1492) and al-Qalqashandi (d. 1418) attribute both facts to Umar. Al-Zubayri further relates that Uthman privately named Amr as the second-in-line to succeed him as caliph after the leading companion of Muhammad, al-Zubayr ibn al-Awwam. Amr was relegated to second-in-line because of his young age at the time. According to the modern historian Wilferd Madelung, this testament by Uthman most likely occurred during his illness in the year 644/45 and was discarded as soon as Uthman regained his health.

During the rule of the Damascus-based Caliph Mu'awiya I, founder of the Umayyad Caliphate, Amr married his daughter Ramla and they lived in Medina, the former capital of Amr's father. Amr and Mu'awiya likely maintained friendly ties for much of the caliph's reign, but latent tension may have developed between them due to Mu'awiya's suspicions of Amr's ambitions for the caliphate and the influence of their Umayyad kinsman Marwan ibn al-Hakam over Amr to pursue the caliphate. The modern historian Asad Q. Ahmed views these claims as difficult to "verify or refute". Amr's role in the Battle of al-Harra in 683 between the Syrian army of Mu'awiya's son and successor Yazid I and the people of Medina who declared rebellion against the caliph is inconsistently reported in the traditional sources: al-Baladhuri holds that Amr fought alongside the Medinese and was consequently castigated and flogged by the victorious Syrian general Muslim ibn Uqba; Awana ibn al-Hakam holds that Amr was not expelled with the rest of the Umayyads of Medina, remained in the city and was punished by Ibn Uqba; while Abu Mikhnaf claims Amr was expelled with the Umayyads but refused to divulge intelligence about Medina's defenses as requested by Ibn Uqba.

After Marwan, who had been expelled from Medina in 683, was elected caliph by the Syrian loyalists of the Umayyads in 684, Amr refused to recognize his caliphate. Nonetheless, there was apparently close ties between Amr and Marwan's household; Amr or Umar was married to Marwan's niece Umm Kulthum bint al-Harith ibn al-Hakam and married off his own daughter Umm Ayyub to Marwan's son and successor Caliph Abd al-Malik. Amr continued to live in the Hejaz and died in Mina.

Descendants 
From his marriage to Ramla, Amr had two sons, Uthman and Khalid. The former died childless, while Khalid became a dignitary of Medina with several descendants who forged strong marital, political and economic links with the rest of the Umayyad clan in Syria and Medina. Amr had a son named Umar from a slave woman; though there is scant mention of Umar in the historical record, his son Abd Allah al-Arji became a well-known Umayyad poet in Medina, fought in the anti-Byzantine campaigns of the Umayyad general Maslama ibn Abd al-Malik, was imprisoned for wine drinking and died in a Medina jail during the reign of Caliph Hisham.

References

Bibliography 

630s births
7th-century Arabs
Children of Rashidun caliphs
Umayyad dynasty
People of the Second Fitna
Tabi‘un hadith narrators